Jerome Herbert "Chip" Zien (born March 20, 1947) is an American actor. He is best known for playing the lead role of the Baker in the original Broadway production of Into the Woods by Stephen Sondheim. He has appeared in all of the "Marvin Trilogy" musicals by William Finn: In Trousers, March of the Falsettos, Falsettoland and Falsettos. He played Monsieur Thénardier in the Broadway production of Les Misérables and Mark Rothenberg in the film United 93. He is also known for providing the voice of the titular character in the film Howard the Duck.

Early life
Zien was born in Milwaukee, Wisconsin, and graduated from Whitefish Bay High School and later from the University of Pennsylvania. There, he was the chairman of the Mask and Wig Club, the nation's oldest all-male collegiate musical comedy troupe.

Career
Young Zien started in local theatrical productions. One of his early roles was as a child in a production of South Pacific at the Melody Top summer outdoor theatre in Milwaukee.

Stage
Zien's first major role was in 1977 at the Manhattan Theater Club in the musical The Redemption Center (by 
Ron Cowen, Seth Glassman, and Sandy Naishtat), opposite Alice Playten as the young couple. Later, Chip received acclaim in the role of Marvin in William Finn's first musical, In Trousers, which ran Off-Broadway in 1979. In its sequels, March of the Falsettos (1981) and Falsettoland, this role was played by Michael Rupert, while Zien played Mendel, a role he reprised when these two one-act musicals were joined together and played Broadway as Falsettos in 1992. In 1998 Zien was featured in another Finn musical when he played a children's show host called Mr. Bungee, dressed as a frog, in A New Brain Off-Broadway at the Lincoln Center Mitzi E. Newhouse Theater. He received a 1999 Drama Desk Award nomination for Outstanding Featured Actor in a Musical for this role.

He appeared in the Off-Broadway play by Wendy Wasserstein Isn't It Romantic in a Playwrights Horizons production at the Lucille Lortel Theatre, opening in June 1984. He was nominated for the 1984 Drama Desk Award, Featured Actor in a Play. He originated the role of the Baker in Into the Woods in 1986 at the Old Globe Theatre in San Diego and on Broadway in 1987.

Zien starred on Broadway in Ride the Winds (as Inari) (1974), The Suicide (as Victor Victorovich) (1980), Grand Hotel (as Otto Kringelein) (1989) and The Boys from Syracuse (as Dromio of Ephesus) (2002). He appeared in the City Center Encores! staged concert production of Applause as Buzz Richards in 2008.

In 2005, Zien played the part of Goran in Chitty Chitty Bang Bang on Broadway.

From April 1 to June 19, 2011, Zien appeared in the Roundabout Theatre Company's production of The People in the Picture, which played at Studio 54 on Broadway.

Zien appeared in a revival of Into the Woods at the Delacourt Theater in Central Park from August 9 to September 1, 2012. He played the Mysterious Man, the father of the character he had originated in the original production 26 years prior.

Zien appeared in the Broadway musical It Shoulda Been You at the Brooks Atkinson Theatre as Murray with music by Barbara Anselmi, book and lyrics by Brian Hargrove.  The show, marking the directorial debut of David Hyde Pierce, starred Tyne Daly, Harriet Harris, Sierra Boggess, and David Burtka, and opened in previews March 17, 2015, and officially on April 14.

Film and television
In 1973, Zien made his television debut on an episode of Love, American Style. More guest roles in television followed, and in the early 1980s, he began a stream of regular TV roles. In 1981, he appeared on Ryan's Hope as Daniel Thorne, the producer of the fictional Proud and the Passionate soap opera on the series in which the character Barbara Wilde (Judith Barcroft) was starring. Later that year, he began a two-year run in the freshman NBC sitcom Love, Sidney as Jason Stoller, the young, hot-shot ad agency director who was Sidney Shorr's (Tony Randall) boss. Immediately after Love, Sidney'''s cancellation, Zien was cast in a similar role on the ABC sitcom Reggie, an American adaptation of the British series The Fall and Rise of Reginald Perrin. He played C.J. Wilcox, the overbearing young boss of Richard Mulligan's Reggie Potter. The series aired as a summer replacement during August and September 1983, but was not renewed by ABC after the tryout run. In 1986, he provided the voice of the title character in Marvel Comics' Howard the Duck. Zien later starred on the short-lived CBS drama Shell Game in 1987.

In the 1990s, Zien was part of the ensemble cast of the CBS sitcom Almost Perfect (1995–96), playing neurotic screenwriter Gary Karp. Almost Perfect was cancelled shortly into its second season, but the series sustained its loyal following via reruns on USA Network not long after. Zien would return to regular roles in daytime drama, first on Guiding Light in early 1999, and by that summer, as newspaper reporter Donald Steele on All My Children, a role that would last until 2001.

From 1999 to 2000, Zien had a recurring guest role on the CBS primetime drama Now and Again as Gerald Misenbach. He has appeared repeatedly as Attorney Cromwell on Law & Order.

During the 2002–03 season, Zien was the announcer on daytime's The Caroline Rhea Show, which was based in New York (on the former Rosie O'Donnell Show set). In 2006, he appeared in the critically acclaimed film United 93 as Mark Rothenberg. He played Dr. Marsh in the vampire comedy film Rosencrantz and Guildenstern Are Undead''.

Personal life
Zien is married to former dancer and dancing instructor Susan Pilarre; the couple have two children.

Acting credits

Theatre

Film and television

References

External links

 (archive)

1947 births
Living people
American male film actors
American male television actors
American male stage actors
Male actors from Milwaukee
University of Pennsylvania alumni
Jewish American male actors
Jewish film people
American male voice actors
Whitefish Bay High School alumni
20th-century American male actors
21st-century American male actors
21st-century American Jews